Shepherd's Bush Football Club were an English football club based in Shepherd's Bush, in the London Borough of Hammersmith and Fulham, although they originally played in central and south London.

History
The club were founded as Old St Stephen's FC in 1880 in Westminster, although they soon moved out to play in Denmark Hill and Nunhead. In 1892 they were founder members of the Southern Alliance, one of the first attempts at a league in southern England, and topped the table before the competition was abandoned before the 1892–93 season was out.

They continued to play in the Southern League under the Old St Stephen's name for another three seasons, never performing better than their inaugural season. During this time, in 1895, they moved across London to Shepherd's Bush, playing on Shepherd's Bush Green itself, which was to host football at the 1908 Summer Olympics (linked article says this event took place at White City stadium). In 1898 Old St Stephen's merged with another local team to become Shepherd's Bush FC. They took Old St Stephen's place in the Southern League and continued to play up until the 1901–02 season.

Gaining the nickname of "the Bushmen", the club moved to Wormholt Farm, but when that site was threatened with development in 1904, Shepherd's Bush built and moved into the Loftus Road ground nearby; they played their first game there against Old Malvernians on 22 October 1904. In 1907, the club joined the Spartan League, after winning the 1906–07 Great Western Suburban League, and a year later the Isthmian League, where they played until the outbreak of World War I.

During wartime, Shepherd's Bush F.C. were unable to play any further fixtures and disbanded in 1915. In 1917, their ground, Loftus Road, was taken over by Queens Park Rangers, who continue to occupy it.

References

Further reading

Defunct football clubs in England
Association football clubs established in 1880
Association football clubs disestablished in 1915
Sport in Hammersmith and Fulham
Defunct football clubs in London
Southern Football League clubs
Isthmian League
1880 establishments in England
1915 disestablishments in England
Shepherd's Bush
Great Western Suburban League